United Brethren Church is a church at 1103 K Street in Aurora, Nebraska.

It was built in 1912 and was added to the National Register in 2008.

References

Churches in Nebraska
Churches on the National Register of Historic Places in Nebraska
Tudor Revival architecture in Nebraska
Churches completed in 1912
Buildings and structures in Hamilton County, Nebraska
1912 establishments in Nebraska
Brethren church buildings
National Register of Historic Places in Hamilton County, Nebraska